Euspira montagui is a species of predatory sea snail, a marine gastropod mollusk in the family Naticidae, the moon snails.

Description

Distribution
This species occurs in the Northeast Atlantic Ocean, European waters and the Mediterranean Sea.

Records of Euspira fusca, Euspira pallida and Euspira  montagui are only known from older literature (de Malzine, 1867; Colbeau, 1868; Pelseneer, 1881; Maitland, 1897; Vonck, 1933). They are possibly completely or partly based on wrong identifications of fossil species that also occur at the Belgian coast.

References

 Backeljau, T. (1986). Lijst van de recente mariene mollusken van België [List of the recent marine molluscs of Belgium]. Koninklijk Belgisch Instituut voor Natuurwetenschappen: Brussels, Belgium. 106 pp.
 Gofas, S.; Le Renard, J.; Bouchet, P. (2001). Mollusca, in: Costello, M.J. et al. (Ed.) (2001). European register of marine species: a check-list of the marine species in Europe and a bibliography of guides to their identification. Collection Patrimoines Naturels, 50: pp. 180–213
 Torigoe K. & Inaba A. (2011) Revision on the classification of Recent Naticidae. Bulletin of the Nishinomiya Shell Museum 7: 133 + 15 pp., 4 pls

External links

Naticidae
Gastropods described in 1838
Taxa named by Edward Forbes